Žvelgaitis (Svelgates; literally: looker-about) was a Lithuanian duke who died in 1205. He is the first Lithuanian duke whose name is known from reliable sources. The account of his expedition and death is given by Henry of Livonia, an early thirteenth-century German chronicler of Latvian history, spanning the years 1186-1227. Žvelgaitis is called "rich and powerful," but he was not the supreme duke, as he led the army in the name of another, more powerful duke.

In 1205, Žvelgaitis led several thousand horsemen northward, from Lithuania through Riga, on the way to attack and plunder Estonia. Returning from Estonia mid-winter, with booty and Estonian slaves, his troops were caught unaware and attacked while crossing through waist-high snowdrifts. He was attacked by the Livonian and German citizens of Riga, under the leadership of Vester, ruler of Semigallians, coordinating the attack from a sleigh. Žvelgaitis was killed by a javelin thrown by German Theodore Schilling. 1,200 Lithuanian knights perished; the Estonian slaves were slaughtered as well, in retribution for "past crimes" against the Livonians. In Lithuania, the return of Žvelgaitis was missed, and it is said that as many as fifty wives of the Lithuanian soldiers killed themselves in grief, hoping to be all the sooner at the sides of their slain husbands.

References

See also
 List of early Lithuanian dukes

1205 deaths
Military personnel killed in action
Year of birth unknown
Place of birth unknown
Deaths by javelin
13th-century Lithuanian nobility